Doğancı can refer to:

 Doğancı, Bayramiç
 Doğancı, Biga
 Doğancı, Bolu, a village in Turkey
 Doğancı, Çamlıdere, a village in Turkey
 Doğancı, Hizan, a village in Turkey
 Doğancı, Manyas, a village in Turkey
 Doğancı, Yeniçağa, a village in Turkey
 the Turkish name for Elia, Nicosia in Cyprus